The Mallarino–Bidlack Treaty (also known as the Bidlack Treaty and Treaty of New Granada) was a treaty signed between New Granada (today Colombia and Panama) and the United States, on December 12, 1846. U.S. minister Benjamin Alden Bidlack negotiated the pact with New Granada's commissioner Manuel María Mallarino.

Officially, it was entitled Tratado de Paz, Amistad, Navegación y Comercio (Treaty of Peace, Friendship, Commerce and Navigation), and was meant to represent an agreement of mutual cooperation. It granted the U.S. significant transit rights over the Panamanian isthmus, as well as military powers to suppress social conflicts and independence struggles targeted against Colombia. Under the Bidlack-Mallarino Treaty, the U.S. intervened militarily many times on the isthmus, usually against civilians, peasant guerrillas, or Liberal Party independence struggles. After the beginning of the California Gold Rush of 1848, the U.S. spent seven years constructing a trans-isthmian Panama Railway. The end result of the treaty, however, was to give the United States a legal opening in politically and economically influencing the Panama isthmus, which was part of New Granada at the time, but was later to become the independent country of Panama in accordance with the wishes of the United States. In 1903, however, the United States failed to gain access to a strip on the isthmus for the construction of a canal, and reversed its position on Panamanian secession from the Republic of Colombia.

See also
Panama Canal
Latin America – United States relations
List of United States treaties

References

Further reading
 Bevans, Charles I. (ed.), Treaties and Other International Agreements of the United States of America 1776–1949, vol. 6 (1971), pp. 865–881.
 Findling, John E., Dictionary of American Diplomatic History, 2d ed. (1989).
 McCullough, David, The Path Between the Seas: The Creation of the Panama Canal, 1870—1914, Simon & Schuster New York 1977 Octavo, pp. 698,  (Pbk.)

External links
 Peace, amity, navigation, and commerce, 1846. United States Treaties and International Agreement, compiled by Charles I. Bevans. Library of Congress.

History of Panama
Treaties of the United States
Treaties of the Republic of New Granada
1846 treaties
Colombia–United States relations
1846 in Colombia
December 1846 events